Shanaga is a rural locality (an ulus) in Bichursky District, Republic of Buryatia, Russia. The population was 455 as of 2010. There are 3 streets.

Geography 
Shanaga is located 61 km northeast of Bichura (the district's administrative centre) by road. Potanino is the nearest rural locality.

References 

Rural localities in Bichursky District